Boris Milev (June 29, 1903 Sofia – April 28, 1983 Sofia) was a Bulgarian communist who worked in the theater, cinema, journalism, known for his role in the French Resistance as the political director of the FTP-MOI in the Paris region during World War II.

Early life
Boris Milev was born in Sofia to a poor family of five children. He was raised by his mother and grandmother. In his youth, he becomes active in the circles of the left. Received first in the national theater competition in 1922, he began a theatrical career. Arrested, then released, he became a teacher in the village of Kapatovo, region of Petrich, in the south of Bulgaria. He joined the Bulgarian Communist Party in 1925, to escape reprisals, he emigrated to Paris in 1925. He worked there as a sandal braider, then became Charles Dullin’s assistant at the Atelier theatre. Caught up in the consequences of a former strike, he was deported to Belgium in 1928. An activist in the Communist Party of Belgium, he spent time in the Saint-Gilles prison. Expelled, he returned to France in 1929, where he resumed his work as a sandal braider. In 1931 he returned to Bulgaria where he continued his political and literary activities (newspapers Echo, RLF, magazines Anvil, Theatre and others). In 1932 he becomes a permanent member of the Bulgarian Communist Party. Wounded during his arrest in 1935, he was tried and sentenced. A few months later, he escaped from the Sofia central prison. He managed to return to France as a clandestine in 1936. He was then sent on a mission to Poland under the direction of the future General Ivan Vinarov, who collaborated with the secret services abroad of the Soviet Union. He later had to leave Poland for France in a hurry to avoid being arrested.

Beginning of the war
At the end of 1939, as an "unwanted" foreigner, he was interned in Fresnes, then in the Vernet camp, then in the Milles camp, from which he escaped. Arrested later by the Germans, he was sent to the Chalon-sur-Saône prison but was soon released when Bulgaria became an ally of the Third Reich in 1941. Boris Milev then returns to Paris and joins a sandal-making cooperative with some compatriots. It is a good cover for his activities against the Nazi occupier from July 1942. The Bulgarian team in Paris is made up of Vladimir Chterbanov, Nikolai Radulov, Georgi Radulov, Dimitar Gentchev - Bateto, Nikolai Zadgorsky and Nicolas Marinov. The group is part of the Combatants and partisans - Migrant Workforce (FTP-MOI Franc-tireurs et partisans - Main-d'oeuvre immigrée) and receives its orders from its military chief Boris Holban (Roger).

Political director in the French Resistance
In January 1943, Jacques Kaminski (Hervé) transmitted to Boris Milev the decision of the central committee of the PCF (French communist party) to make him a permanent staff and to include him in the tri-partite direction of the FTP-MOI of the Paris region as their political leader. His superiors will be Henri Rol-Tanguy (Yves)  and Robert Ballanger (Lapierre). Numerous actions are then launched against the Nazi occupier. Their job is to coordinate the fight groups and their actions, to recruit new combatants, to convince them of the merits of the armed struggle, sometimes to test them and to reinforce their fighting spirit. One of the recruitments is that of Missak Manouchian (Georges), who will be at the heart of the Affiche Rouge (Red Poster). Understanding that he was being followed by the police, Boris Milev was sent in May 1943 to the north and east of France. In November 1943 Louis Gronowski (Brunot), announced to him that the central committee of the PCF had appointed him as the political leader of the FTP-MOI. With the help of the FTP in the field, Soviet prisoners escaped and entered the clandestine resistance

After the war
Boris Milev took part in the uprising in Paris in August 1944. On August 21, with a few compatriots, they took control of the Bulgarian legation. At the end of the war, Boris Milev, with a group of ten compatriots, returned to Bulgaria after a long journey. In 1945 he became editor-in-chief of the weekly Знаме на труда (Labor Flag). He founded with Nicolas Aleksiev the daily Труд (Work) on September 15, 1946. Victim of the Stalinist trials, in 1951 he will serve 6 months in prison and will then be rehabilitated. He was the Director of the Documentary Films Studio (Студията за хроникални и документални филми) from 1950 to 1958. He was Bulgaria's ambassador to UNESCO from 1958 to 1963 in Paris, and then ambassador to Guinea and Sierra Leone in 1968–1971. He died in Sofia in 1983

Books (selection)

Boris Milev, The trade union movement in France, ORPS, 1946, 40 p.
Boris Milev-Ogin, Pages, memories, State Military Publishing House, 1973, 432 p.
Boris Milev-Ogin, Mihail Berberov, Anton, Living legend, Homeland Publishing House, 1981, 116 p.
Boris Milev-Ogin, Pages, Party Edition, 1982, 487 p.
Boris Milev-Ogin, Paris is hungry, Paris is cold, but no longer ashamed, The Paris uprising, August 1944, Fatherland Front, 1984, 185 p.

Documentary films (selection)

An inspiring example, 1950
The Apostle of Liberty, 1955
The Arda song, with Aleksandar Roupchin, 1957
Our capital, with Aleksandar Roupchin, 1958
Combat groups, with Aleksandar Roupchin, 1974

Books

 Boris Holban, Testament (testament), Calmann-Lévy, Paris, 1989, 324 p. 
 Stéphane Courtois, Denis Peschanski, Adam Rayski, Le sang de l’étranger (The blood of the foreigner), Fayard, 1989, 470p., 
 Louis Gronowski-Brunot, Le dernier grand soir. Un Juif de Pologne (The last big night. A Jew from Poland), Le Seuil, 1980, 288p., 
 Gaston Laroche, On les nommait des étrangers, Les immigrés dans la Résistance (They were called foreigners, Immigrants in the Resistance), 1965, Les Éditeurs Français Réunis, 477 p.
 Roger Bourderon, Rol-Tanguy, Des brigades internationales à la libération de Paris (From international brigades to the liberation of Paris), 2013,  Tallandier, 768 p., 
 Colonel Rol-Tanguy, Roger Bourderon, Libération de Paris, Les cent documents (Liberation of Paris, The Hundred Documents), Hachette, 1994, 330p.,

Awards 
 Croix du combattant (N° 759514 - 1974)

References 

Bulgarian communists

1903 births
1983 deaths